Kut Rang is a district (amphoe) of Maha Sarakham province, northeastern Thailand.

Geography
Neighboring districts are (from the north clockwise): Kosum Phisai, Borabue, and Na Chueak of Maha Sarakham Province; and Pueai Noi and Ban Phai of Khon Kaen province.

History
The minor district (king amphoe) was split off from Borabue district on 1 April 1995.

All 81 minor districts were upgraded to full districts in 2007. With publication in the Royal Gazette on 24 August, the upgrade became official.

Administration
The district is divided into five sub-districts (tambons), which are further subdivided into 85 villages (mubans). There are no municipal (thesabans). There are five tambon administrative organizations (TAO).

References

External links
amphoe.com

Kut Rang